Clytus canadensis is a species of beetle in the family Cerambycidae. It was described by Hopping in 1928.

References

Clytini
Beetles described in 1928